Pantai Amban is a beach on the northeast head of the Bird's Head Peninsula, West Papua, Indonesia,  north of Amban village and  north of Manokwari. Surrounded by tropical forest and swampland, the black sand beach is a notable surfing spot.

See also
 List of beaches in Indonesia

References

Beaches of Western New Guinea
Landforms of West Papua (province)
Manokwari
Surfing locations in Western New Guinea
Tourist attractions in West Papua (province)